"Getting a Drag" was the second single released by Lynsey de Paul. The song was co-written with David Jordan, and featured the de Paul penned b-side "Brandy". Released in November 1972 on MAM Records, the single entered the UK Singles Chart and peaked at number 18 and was still in the charts in early 1973. The single also reached number 46 on the German Singles Chart and had a four week run on the Dutch Single Tip chart where it peaked at number 7. It reached number 1 on the Israeli Galei Tzahal chart, No. 2 on the Radio Northsea International chart, and No. 12 in January 1973 on the Turkish singles chart as published in Milliyet.

De Paul later said "This was my comment on the times and is about a girl who finds her boyfriend wearing her clothes and is angry, not because he is wearing them, but because he looks better than she does. It was tongue-in-cheek. I did it on Top Of The Pops when Marc Bolan was on set and was waiting to perform his song immediately afterwards". In his article "‘Children of the Revolution’: Glam Rock and the 70s" published in the New Socialist, Toby Manning wrote "‘Getting a Drag’ cleverly using gender performativity to queer gender roles (“I thought you were a brother but you turned out like my mother”)". The song has also been covered by Franz Lambert, Excelsior on the album Música Em Sua Vida, and most recently by a  group named Grease Jar. A Japanese language version by Kuko & Angels was released as their debut single in 1973. The B-side was also covered by Miki Asakura with new lyrics as "Friday Night" on her 1981 album Sexy Elegance.

De Paul's version was also a prize winning song at the 1973 International Contest of the Tokyo Music Festival in 1973. The song title was translated as "Sigh of Love".

References

1972 songs
1972 singles
Lynsey de Paul songs
Songs written by Lynsey de Paul
MAM Records singles